Femme Fatale is the final album by Hungarian guitarist Gábor Szabó featuring performances recorded in 1979 and released on the Hungarian Pepita label in 1981.

Reception
The AllMusic review states: "'Out of the Night' interestingly pairs him with pianist Chick Corea. But the remainder of the record is a standard late-'70s fusion date."

Track listing
All compositions by Gábor Szabó except as indicated
 "Femme Fatale" – 8:13 
 "Zingaro" (Antonio Carlos Jobim) – 7:08 
 "Serena" (James Harrah) – 3:37 
 "A Thousand Times" – 9:17 
 "Out of the Night" (Chick Corea) – 8:07 
Recorded at Fidelity Recording Studio in Studio City, Los Angeles

Personnel
Gábor Szabó – guitar
Chick Corea – piano (tracks 1, 4, 5)
Leon Bisquera – keyboards
James Harrah – guitar
David Roney – electric bass
Hugh Moran – drums
Everette Bryson – percussion
Gary Grant – trumpet, flugelhorn
 Jerry Hey – trumpet, flugelhorn
William Reichenbach – trombone
Kim Hutchcroft – reeds 
Larry Williams – reeds
Lawrence Sonderling – violin
 Bobby Dubow – violin
 Ken Yerke – violin
 John Wittenberg – violin
 Sheldon Sanov – violin
 Carol Shive – violin
Pamela Goldsmith – viola
Arthur Royval – viola
Michael Nowak – viola
Ronald Cooper – cello
Ray Kelley – cello
David Campbell – arranger, conductor

References

External links 
 Gábor Szabó - Femme Fatale (1981) album releases & credits at Discogs
 Gábor Szabó - Femme Fatale (1981) album to be listened on Spotify
 Gábor Szabó - Femme Fatale (1981) album to be listened on YouTube

Gábor Szabó albums
1978 albums
Albums produced by Gábor Szabó